"Mysterious Times" is a song by German production group Sash! featuring British singer Tina Cousins. It was released on 1 August 1998 as the second single from their second album, Life Goes On (1998). The song peaked at number two in the United Kingdom, giving Sash! their fourth number-two single. In the United States, it peaked at number 11 on the Billboard Hot Dance Club Play chart.

Critical reception
Jon O'Brien from AllMusic stated that "Mysterious Times" is "arguably his best single", describing it as a "subtle attempt at progressive house." A reviewer from Daily Record commented, "Dance guru Sash! is in disappointing form here as he takes his production expertise to a previously undiscovered level of bland." The newspaper also complimented Cousins' "melodramatic vocals" on the track.

Chart performance
"Mysterious Times" climbed into the top 10 in Denmark, Finland, Italy, and Norway, as well as on the Eurochart Hot 100, where it reached number six. In the United Kingdom, the single peaked at number two during its first week on the UK Singles Chart, on 9 August 1998, held off the top spot by Boyzone with "No Matter What". Additionally, "Mysterious Times" was a top-20 hit in Belgium (Flanders and Wallonia), France, Germany, Ireland, the Netherlands, and Sweden. In Iceland and Switzerland, it charted within the top 30. Outside Europe, it peaked at number 11 on the US Billboard Dance Club Songs chart, number 28 on the New Zealand Singles Chart, and number 62 on the Australian Singles Chart. The single earned a gold record in Belgium, France, and Sweden. In the UK, it received a silver disc on 11 September 1998.

Music video
A music video was made for "Mysterious Times", directed by Sven Harding. It was uploaded to YouTube in October 2016. By September 2020, the video had more than 14 million views.

Track listings

 German maxi-CD single
 "Mysterious Times" (radio mix) – 3:32
 "Mysterious Times" (Todd Terry's radio edit) – 3:26
 "Mysterious Times" (original maxi) – 5:22
 "Mysterious Times" (Cyrus & The Joker Meets Bossi mix) – 7:34
 "Mysterious Times" (John B. Norman mix) – 7:04
 "Mysterious Times" (Todd Terry's club mix) – 6:52

 European CD single
 "Mysterious Times" (radio mix) – 3:32
 "Mysterious Times" (Todd Terry's radio edit) – 3:26

 UK cassette single
 "Mysterious Times" (radio mix) – 3:32
 "Mysterious Times" (Todd Terry's club mix) – 6:52

 UK CD1
 "Mysterious Times" (radio mix) – 3:32
 "Mysterious Times" (Tin Tin Out mix) – 6:09
 "Mysterious Times" (John B. Norman mix) – 7:04
 "Mysterious Times" (video)

 UK CD2
 "Mysterious Times" (radio edit) – 3:32
 "Mysterious Times" (Todd Terry club mix) – 6:52
 "Mysterious Times" (Cyrus & The Joker Meets Bossi mix) – 7:34

Charts and certifications

Weekly charts

Year-end charts

Certifications

References

External links
 

1998 singles
1998 songs
Multiply Records singles
Sash! songs
Tina Cousins songs